Ellisdale may refer to:

Ellisdale, New Jersey, United States, an unincorporated community
Ellisdale Fossil Site, a fossil bed near Ellisdale